Waimahana Bay is a bay and remote rural community in the Far North District and Northland Region of New Zealand's North Island.

The community is centred around the Waimahana Marae and Te Puhi o Te Waka meeting house, a tribal meeting ground of the Ngāti Kahu ki Whangaroa hapū of Ngāti Aukiwa and the Ngāpuhi / Ngāti Kahu ki Whaingaroa hapū of Ngāti Aukiwa.  Waimahana Bay lies in between two other bays that are equally as beautiful, Omatā and Okokori Bay.

References

Far North District
Populated places in the Northland Region
Landforms of the Northland Region